Abraham Ángel Card Valdés (March 7, 1905 – October 27, 1924) was a Mexican artist known under his given names Abraham Ángel; he dropped his surnames after his brother Adolfo expelled him from his family home when Abraham Ángel was barely 16.

Life 
Abraham Ángel was born in El Oro, State of México, being the youngest of five. His father was Lewis Edward Card Burke (originally Carthburke Beedgar), a Welsh miner and adventurer, who travelled continuously throughout the country in search of fortune in gold and silver mines. His mother, Francisca Valdez, was from Sinaloa, México. At just 14, she left home to follow Lewis to El Oro, and form a family with him. Lewis, a gambler and womanizer, left a few years later, rarely seeing the family again.

The older brother, Adolfo, became head of the family, which left in search of a better life to Puebla, Mexico, where Abraham Ángel spent his childhood. At age 11 he moved to Mexico City with his mother, his sister Amelia and his older brother Adolfo, who remained in charge. Abraham Ángel was raised in a strict Protestant environment, the religion professed by his father, which had been energetically adopted by his brother Adolfo.

At age 16, Abraham Ángel decided to attend art and painting studies at Escuela Nacional de Bellas Artes (also known as Academia de San Carlos), a decision met with absolute opposition from his brother Adolfo. Abraham Ángel refused to comply, so he ended up being expelled from his home, to the astonishment and sadness of his mother and sister. It was 1921, and Abraham Ángel had already met Manuel Rodríguez Lozano, his tutor, with whom he had an intense homosexual affair, and who gave lessons in drawing based on the methods of Adolfo Best Maugard. In that difficult moment Abraham Ángel decided to drop his surnames and moved to his lover's home.

A couple of years later, Lozano chose another young artist, Julio Castellanos, as his protégé, and abandoned Abraham Ángel. Humiliated and depressed, he was found dead on October 27, 1924, from a cocaine overdose, either an accident or suicide.

His scarce works, numbering around 30 known paintings, are highly appreciated and valued by museums and art collectors.

List of works 

 Amelia
 Autoretrato (1923)
 La Bañadora
 El Cadete
 La Chica (1924)
 La Chica de la Ventana
 Concepción (1921)
 Concha
 Retrato de Señorita Eperanza Crespo, aka Cristina
 La India
 La Familia
 La Mulita (1923)
 Lupe y Maria
 Retrato de Manuel Rodriguez Lozano
 Me Mato
 La Mesera (circa 1923)
 Los Novios
 Paisaje Cuernavaca
 Paisaje Cuernavaca (there are two)
 Paisaje Ixtapalapa
 Paisaje Tepito
 Retrato
 Serpiente
 Tesis 
 Retrato de Hugo Tilghman (1924)

References

External links 

 Arte-Mexico

1905 births
1924 deaths
20th-century Mexican painters
20th-century Mexican male artists
Mexican male painters
Mexican people of Welsh descent
People from El Oro (México)
Bisexual painters
Bisexual men
Mexican bisexual people
Mexican LGBT painters
Drug-related deaths in Mexico
20th-century Mexican LGBT people